Cumbers is a family name. Notable people with the name include:

Luis Cumbers (born 1988), English footballer
Simon Cumbers (1968–2004), Irish journalist murdered in Saudi Arabia
Sydney Cumbers (1875–1959), British collector of merchant navy memorabilia

George Ernest Cumbers (1892 -1918) played for the Winnipeg Falcons Hockey Club  was apart of the Canadian Railway Troops, 13th Light Railway Operating Company

See also
Cumbers Reef - Part of the Amiot Islands, named for a British naval officer